May Grethe Lerum (born 5 May 1965 in Sogn) is a Norwegian novelist. She is the author of the novel series Livets doetre (35 books) and Solgudens krukke (10 books).

References

1965 births
Living people
People from Sogn og Fjordane
21st-century Norwegian women writers
20th-century Norwegian women writers
Norwegian women novelists